Cover to Cover is a studio album of cover songs recorded by Neal Morse, Mike Portnoy and Randy George during the recording of the albums Testimony (2003), One (2004) and ? (2005) by Neal Morse. Most of these songs have previously been released on special editions of those albums. Released in 2006.

Track listing

Personnel 

 Chris Carmichael - violin, cello, viola
 Randy George - bass
 Jerry Guidroz - engineer, mixing
 Jim Hoke - saxophone
 Bill Hubauer - trombone
 Phil Keaggy - vocals
 Ken Love - mastering
 Neal Morse - guitar, keyboards, vocals, producer, mixing
 Rich Mouser - mixing
 Joey Pippin - graphic design, photography
 Mike Portnoy - drums, liner notes
 Neal Rosengarden - trumpet

References 

Covers albums
2006 albums
Neal Morse albums